Khonoma Nature Conservation and Tragopan Sanctuary or KNCTS is a conservation reserve and a protected area in the Kohima District of the state of Nagaland in India.
The sanctuary is home to several endangered mammal species, including the clouded leopard, Asiatic black bear, and hoolock gibbon, as well as over 300 avian species.

The sanctuary was created in 1998, when alarmed after 300 endangered Blyth's tragopans (Tragopan blythii) were killed by the villagers in one week as part of a hunting competition, the village council demarcated a 20 sqkm area within which hunting was banned and the Khonoma Nature Conservation and Tragopan Sanctuary was created.

Geography
This park lies at the extension of Barail Range; the mountain range complex of north-east India and the undisturbed primary virgin forest is a place for some of the range restricted avian fauna. KNCTS is an Important Bird Area; under criteria A1 (threatened species) and A2 (range restricted species) with area code IN423, as identified by BirdLife International.

Natural history

Ecoregions
The sanctuary includes portions of three ecoregions:
 Himalayan subtropical broadleaf forests
 Northeast India-Myanmar pine forests
 Chin Hills-Arakan Yoma montane forests

Fauna
Birds some of the exotic species from North-east India are present in this wildlife sanctuary; like Blyth's tragopan, Mountain bamboo partridge, Crested Finchbill, Assam laughingthrush, Striped laughingthrush, Spot-breasted scimitar babbler, Flavescent Bulbul, Naga wren-babbler, to name a few.

Mammals like Binturong, Serow, Jungle cat, Barking Deer, Gayal, Pallas's squirrel, Himalayan striped squirrel, clouded leopard, Asiatic black bear, and hoolock gibbon can be seen in this park.

Though deforestation and poaching was a major threat for nature and wildlife in Nagaland; however Khonoma may be considered one of the safest place for wild birds and mammals. Community conservation played a major role in protecting the biodiversity of the area.

References

External links
Nagaland ENVIS Hub

Wildlife sanctuaries in Nagaland
Protected areas of Nagaland
Kohima district
Protected areas with year of establishment missing